Brown County High School may refer to

Brown County High School (Illinois)
Brown County High School (Indiana)